Trinidad and Tobago competed at the 2004 Summer Olympics in Athens, Greece, from 13 to 29 August 2004. This was the nation's sixteenth appearance at the Summer Olympics as an independent nation, although it had previously appeared in four editions as part of the British colony and the West Indies Federation. 
Trinidad and Tobago Olympic Committee sent a total of nineteen athletes to the Games, ten men and nine women, to compete only in track and field (the largest by sport), shooting, swimming, and taekwondo, which made its Olympic debut; the nation's team size was relatively similar to the record in Sydney four years earlier.

Eight athletes from the Trinidad and Tobago team had previously competed in Sydney, including swimmer and double Pan American Games champion George Bovell, sprinters Ato Modibo, who later married to Caymanian athlete Cydonie Mothersille, and Ato Boldon, who became the most decorated athlete for Trinidad and Tobago with a staggering record of four Olympic medals. Because of his repeated successes and being the most sophisticated athlete of the team as a four-time Olympian, Boldon reprised his role to carry the Trinidad and Tobago flag in the opening ceremony for the second time.

Trinidad and Tobago left Athens with a remarkable historic milestone from George Bovell, being the nation's first ever swimmer to win an Olympic bronze medal in the men's 200 m individual medley.

Medalists

Athletics

Trinidad and Tobago athletes have so far achieved qualifying standards in the following athletics events (up to a maximum of 3 athletes in each event at the 'A' Standard, and 1 at the 'B' Standard).

Men
Track & road events

Field events

Women
Track & road events

Field events

Combined events – Heptathlon

Key
Note–Ranks given for track events are within the athlete's heat only
Q = Qualified for the next round
q = Qualified for the next round as a fastest loser or, in field events, by position without achieving the qualifying target
NR = National record
N/A = Round not applicable for the event
Bye = Athlete not required to compete in round

Shooting 

One Trinidad and Tobago shooter qualified to compete in the following events:

Men

Swimming

Trinidad and Tobago swimmers earned qualifying standards in the following events (up to a maximum of 2 swimmers in each event at the A-standard time, and 1 at the B-standard time):

Men

Women

Taekwondo

Trinidad and Tobago has qualified a single taekwondo jin through the North and South American Qualification Tournament.

See also
 Trinidad and Tobago at the 2003 Pan American Games

References

External links
Official Report of the XXVIII Olympiad
Trinidad and Tobago Olympic Committee

Nations at the 2004 Summer Olympics
2004
Summer Olympics